G. S. Reddy was an Indian politician. He was a Member of Parliament, representing Miryalguda in the Lok Sabha, the lower house of India's Parliament, as a member of the Indian National Congress.

References

External links
Official biographical sketch in Parliament of India website

Lok Sabha members from Andhra Pradesh
Indian National Congress politicians
India MPs 1980–1984
India MPs 1977–1979
India MPs 1967–1970
1917 births
Year of death missing